From List of National Natural Landmarks, these are the National Natural Landmarks in Arkansas.  There are 5 in total, 4 are forests, 1 is a spring.

References 

Arkansas
National Natural Landmarks